This is a list of Ukrainian football transfers summer 2021. Only clubs in 2021–22 Ukrainian Premier League are included.

Ukrainian Premier League

Chornomorets Odesa

In:

Out:

Desna Chernihiv

In:

Out:

Dnipro-1

In:

 

Out:

Dynamo Kyiv

In:

Out:

Inhulets Petrove

In:

Out:

Kolos Kovalivka

In:

Out:

Lviv

In:

Out:

Mariupol

In:

Out:

Metalist 1925 Kharkiv

In:

Out:

Mynai

In:

Out:

Oleksandriya

In:

Out:

Rukh Lviv

In:

Out:

Shakhtar Donetsk

In:

Out:

Veres Rivne

In:

Out:

Vorskla Poltava

In:

Out:

Zorya Luhansk

In:

Out:

Ukrainian First League

Alians Lypova Dolyna

In:

Out:

Kryvbas Kryvyi Rih

In:

Out:

Hirnyk-Sport Horishni Plavni

In:

Out:

Metal Kharkiv 

In:

Out:

Nyva Ternopil 

In:

Out:

Olimpik Donetsk 

In:

 

Out:

Polissya Zhytomyr 

In:

Out:

Podillya Khmelnytskyi 

In:

Out:

VPK-Ahro Shevchenkivka 

In:

Out:

Ukrainian Second League

FC Chernihiv 

In:

  

Out:

Dinaz Vyshhorod 

In:

Out:

Dnipro Cherkasy

In:

Out:

SC Chaika  

In:

Out:

LNZ Cherkasy 

In:

Out:

Karpaty Halych 

In:

Out:

MFC Mykolaiv 

In:

Out:

Livyi Bereh Kyiv 

In:

Out:

References

Ukraine
Transfers
2021-21